Goodie Mob is an American hip hop group based in Atlanta, Georgia, consisting of CeeLo Green, Khujo, T-Mo, and Big Gipp.

History 
The group was formed in 1991 by Cameron "Big Gipp" Gipp, Willie "Khujo" Knighton Jr., CeeLo Green (born Thomas Callaway), and Robert "T-Mo" Barnett in Atlanta, Georgia. In 1995, Goodie Mob released their debut album, Soul Food, which was critically acclaimed and certified Gold. The album aired social and political issues such as racism, discrimination, geopolitics, and gentrification. Their debut single "Cell Therapy" reached number 39 on the Billboard Hot 100 and also topped the Billboard Hot Rap Singles chart. Goodie Mob is part of the hip hop/R&B musical collective, Dungeon Family, also based in Atlanta.

In 1998, Goodie Mob released their second album, Still Standing. The album continued the group's style of social commentary, and CeeLo's singing talents were used more frequently. The group's third album, World Party, veered away from their gritty style and instead incorporated lighter beats and party related subject matter. During its production, CeeLo left the group to pursue a solo career when he was unhappy with the project's direction. Goodie Mob's fourth album, One Monkey Don't Stop No Show, was released in 2004 and suffered a poor reception, resulting in Big Gipp also leaving the group. T-Mo and Khujo formed the duo Lumberjacks, which they released the album Livin' Life as Lumberjacks in 2005. Big Gipp, as part of the duo Ali & Gipp, released their album Kinfolk in 2006.

Also in 2006, all four members of Goodie Mob performed together following a Gnarls Barkley concert, marking the group's reunion. In 2011, Goodie Mob signed with Elektra Records and worked on a new album, which would eventually become Age Against the Machine, released in 2013.

After a seven years gap, they released a new album Survival Kit in November 2020.

Recent history 
On August 19, 2008, Goodie Mob performed on stage together unannounced at the Tabernacle in Atlanta during a free Nelly concert.

On September 19, 2009, Goodie Mob performed for the first official reunion concert at the Masquerade in Atlanta, Georgia. The band also played with all the original members at the Smoke Out festival in San Bernardino, California, on October 23, 2009.

As of 2011, Goodie Mob is signed with Elektra Records.

On March 12, 2010, Goodie Mob performed "Get Rich to This" in Las Vegas, Nevada, for part of the Red Bull Soundclash concert that featured CeeLo.

On April 28, 2011, CeeLo brought out Goodie Mob during his performance at Sunfest in West Palm Beach, Florida. The group performed four songs together, including "Black Ice (Sky High)", "Cell Therapy", and "Soul Food".

On July 25, 2011, CeeLo announced via his Twitter that Goodie Mob's reunion album would be titled We Sell Drugs Too.  However, in February 2012 CeeLo tweeted that the name has been changed to Age Against the Machine.

After Survival Kit was released on November 13, 2020, the group planned to start touring in December 2020.

Filmography

Music videos 
Git Up, Git Out (1994)
Give It 2 You (1995)
What It Ain't (2000)
So Fresh, So Clean (2001)
Dungeon Family - Trans DF Express (2001)
Special Education (2013)

Television 
The 10th Annual Soul Train Music Awards (1996)
Red Hot & Rap (1996)
Teen Summit (1998)
Sister, Sister (1998)
The 1999 Source Hip-Hop Music Awards (1999)
Soul Train (1996-2000), 3 episodes
14th Annual Soul Train Music Awards (2000)
Showtime at the Apollo (2000)
The 2012 Billboard Music Awards (2012)
Unsung (2020)

Discography 

Soul Food (1995)
Still Standing (1998)
World Party (1999)
One Monkey Don't Stop No Show (2004)
Age Against the Machine (2013)
Survival Kit (2020)

References

External links 
 Khujo on the Willie Isz project in HHC Digital magazine
How Cell Therapy predicted the social effects of a pandemic
Survival Kit single "No Cigar" review

Arista Records artists
Dungeon Family members
MNRK Music Group artists
LaFace Records artists
Elektra Records artists
Musical groups established in 1991
Musical groups from Georgia (U.S. state)
Southern hip hop groups
Musical groups from Atlanta